Visa requirements for Lesotho citizens are administrative entry restrictions by the authorities of other states placed on citizens of Lesotho. As of 2 July 2021, Lesotho citizens had visa-free or visa on arrival access to 73 countries and territories, ranking the Lesotho passport 71st in terms of travel freedom according to the Henley Passport Index.

Visa requirements map

Visa requirements

Dependent, Disputed, or Restricted territories
Unrecognized or partially recognized countries

Dependent and autonomous territories

See also
Visa policy of Lesotho
Lesotho passport

References and Notes
References

Notes

Lesotho
Foreign relations of Lesotho